Job served as Greek Patriarch of Alexandria between 954 and 960.

References
 

10th-century Patriarchs of Alexandria
Melkites in the Abbasid Caliphate